Dongguneung (literally "The Nine Eastern Royal Tombs"), is a cluster of royal tombs from the Joseon dynasty, the largest of its kind in South Korea. 17 Joseon kings and queens are buried here. The cluster also houses a myo-type tomb (of a royal family member). It is located in Guri, Gyeonggi Province.

The construction was ordered by King Taejong in 1408 and the ninth tomb was placed there in 1855.

List of tombs

References

Royal Tombs of the Joseon Dynasty
Guri